David Lee Grayson may refer to:

 Dave Grayson (1939–2017), former American football defensive back who played for the Dallas Texans, Kansas City Chiefs, and Oakland Raiders
 David Grayson (American football) (born 1964), his son, professional American football player who played linebacker for five seasons for the Cleveland Browns and San Diego Chargers